The Institute for Doctoral Studies in the Visual Arts is a private low-residency graduate school based in Portland, Maine. It was founded in 2006 by George Smith, who had previously created the Master of Fine Arts program at the Maine College of Art & Design. Smith created the program to offer the Doctor of Philosophy to visual artists who wanted an academic credential beyond the Master of Fine Arts, a group he termed "artist-philosophers". African-American art historian David Driskell called the institution "one of the single most important developments in the recent history of art education."

Students complete much of their work remotely but participate in international residencies, which are held in North America, Europe, and North Africa. The school is accredited by the New England Commission of Higher Education.

References 

Universities and colleges in Maine
Graduate schools in the United States
Educational institutions established in 2006